The female form of the name Horatio.  Persons with this name include
Horatia Nelson (1801-1881), daughter of Horatio Nelson
Juliana Horatia Ewing (1842-1885), children's author, daughter of J. Ewing
Anna Horatia Waldegrave, daughter of James Waldegrave, 2nd Earl Waldegrave, wife of Francis Seymour-Conway, 1st Marquess of Hertford, and mother of George Francis Seymour
the Hon. Horatia Stopford, one of Queen Victoria's maids of honour, painted by James Jebusa Shannon
Horatia Isabella Harriet Morler, wife of Algernon St Maur, 14th Duke of Somerset, making her Duchess of Somerset 
Hilda Horatia Barlow, daughter of Sir Alan Barlow, 2nd Bt, mother of Ruth Padel
Horatia Winwood, character in The Convenient Marriage
Horatia Lawson, sister of Nigella Lawson
Horatia Hughes, daughter of Garreth Hughes

See also
Horatia (disambiguation)